Cooper Elementary School may refer to elementary schools in the following school districts:
W. J. Cooper Elementary School - Gwinnett County Public Schools
Garland Independent School District - Garland, Texas
Johnston County Schools - Clayton, North Carolina
Georgetown Independent School District
Sheboygan Area School District
Bentonville Public Schools - Bella Vista, Arkansas
Spring Independent School District
Hampton City Schools